Wrestling Association of Championship Krushers, also known as W.A.C.K, stylized as W•A•C•K, was a professional wrestling promotion for children that aired on Nickelodeon.

History
A mock press conference was aired on November 22, 2006 to unveil the W.A.C.K! promotion. The series debuted with a 3-hour block on November 25, 2006, which was hosted by stars, Devon Werkheiser and Lindsey Shaw, of the Nickelodeon TV show, Ned's Declassified School Survival Guide. It was originally supposed to air live every weekday, but it changed into a series of specials in 2006.

Plot
The Big Cheese is the current W.A.C.K! Champion and the main star of the show. The contender, Atomic Banana, is after his title. Abominable Snowman betrayed Cowabunga after a big victory over the Wholesome Twins.

Wrestlers
The Big Cheese (Babyface) (Champion)
Atomic Banana (Heel)
Abominable Snowman (Babyface)
Cowabunga (Babyface)
Bling (Babyface)
Trouble Nugget (Heel)
The Wholesome Twins - Skary-Kate & Bashley (Heels)

Episodes

Games
 W.A.C.K! Wrestling Challenge: Nick.com released an online game on the site as a New Game of the Week called "W.A.C.K Wrestling Challenge". Usable parts are from Atomic Banana, Abominable Snowman, Cowabunga, Bling, and Trouble Nugget. There is also no referee in this game, and you can't climb onto the turnbuckles or bounce of the ropes either. However, if you press the 'B' key in the middle of a match, the lights go off.

External links

Nickelodeon original programming
American professional wrestling promotions